FC Wiltz 71 is a football club, based in Wiltz, in north-western Luxembourg. The club is currently playing in the highest football league in Luxembourg.

History
It was formed in 1971 as an amalgam of Union Sportive Niederwiltz and Gold a Ro'd Wiltz. In 1976, it absorbed Arminia Weidingen.

In the 2005–06 season, Wiltz finished fifth in the National Division, but the team was relegated to the Division of Honour after finishing twelfth in the 2007–08 season.

Despite the relegation in 2010–11 into the "Promotion d'Honneur", Sanel Ibrahimović succeed in scoring the most goals (18), which let him win the trophy for best topscorer of the season. FC Wiltz 71 managed to climb once again to the "BGL Ligue" for the season 2012–13.

Honours

Luxembourg Cup
Runners-up (1): 2000–01

Current squad
As of 5 February, 2023.

Managers

 Mike Ney (July 1, 2008 – June 30, 2009)
 Steve Majerus (July 1, 2009 – Oct 27, 2010)
 Pascal Lebrun (Oct 27, 2010 – Nov 5, 2012)
 Samir Kalabic (Nov 6, 2012 – June 30, 2014)
  Claude Ottelé (July 1, 2014 – June 30, 2015)
 Henri Bossi (July 1, 2015 – June 30, 2016)
 Dan Huet (July 1, 2016 – October, 2021)
 David Vandenbroeck (October, 2021 – now)

References

External links
 
 

Wiltz
FC Wiltz 71
Wiltz
1971 establishments in Luxembourg